The hundred of Cliston was the name of one of thirty two ancient administrative units of Devon, England.

The parishes in the hundred were:
Broadclyst;
Butterleigh;
Clyst Hydon;
Clyst St Lawrence and
Whimple.

See also 
 List of hundreds of England and Wales - Devon

References 

Hundreds of Devon